André Bernanose (17 June 1912 – 18 March 2002) was a 20th-century French physicist, chemist and pharmacologist.

He studied chemiluminescence during the late 1940s - early 1950s, which led him to discover the electroluminescence. He is for this reason considered the father of the OLED.

See also 
 OLED

External links 
 Obituary
 OLED, la lumière organique on ARTE
 The OLED on Megatech

French pharmacologists
1912 births
2002 deaths
Scientists from Nancy, France
20th-century French chemists
20th-century French physicists